Priyamvada Kant is an Indian actress, writer and the winner of MTV Splitsvilla Season 12

Career
Priyamvada Kant debuted as Kaumudi with  Bairi Piya in 2010. She worked as negative character Payal in 2011 Hamari Saal Leela and then played character (Anisha) in Sasural Simar Ka, she also played a negative role (Manjeet) in Sabki Laadli Bebo. In August 2013, Kant joined the cast of The Buddy Project, playing a cameo role as Kamna.

She is most known for Tenali Rama where she played the female protagonist Sharda, Tenali Rama's wife.

Kant is currently running a dance academy called Dancamaze. Priyamvada Kant won season 12 of MTV Splitsvilla along with Shrey Mittal. She played Namrata in  Kullfi Kumarr Bajewala.

She now joined Tera Mera Saath Rahe, and is playing the role of Priya.

Filmography
 Heropanti (2014), special appearance (as 'Jassi')
 Bole Chudiyan with Nawazuddin Siddiqui (2020),

Television

References

External links

Living people
Indian television actresses
Actresses in Hindi television
21st-century Indian actresses